Gerda Boyesen (May 18, 1922December 29, 2005) was the founder of Biodynamic Psychology, a branch of Body Psychotherapy.

Life

Gerda Boyesen was born in 1922 in Bergen. Her first marriage was with Carl Christian Boyesen. In 1947 she read a book by Wilhelm Reich which made an impression on her. Shortly thereafter she began therapy with Ola Raknes, a vegetotherapist who had been trained by Reich. Later she studied psychology in Oslo and received training as physiotherapist which led to work with Aadel Bülow-Hansen. Through her own therapy Boyesen got to know the connection between repressed emotions and muscle tensions. In her book Über den Körper die Seele heilen she established and partly described in a very personal manner how she developed her own therapeutic method linking the beginnings of Wilhelm Reich, Carl Gustav Jung and Sigmund Freud, through her own studies, her own therapeutic experience as well as her own practice.

Boyesen was the founder of "Biodynamic Psychology and Psychotherapy". In 1969 she left for London and opened a practice and later an international teaching and training institute. In addition to client-oriented work other focus areas were included, she was the first woman in Europe to establish her own psychotherapeutic training institute.

Boyesen lived and worked in different, mostly European, countries, however, her work influenced body psychotherapy worldwide. Her books were translated into other languages. She trained psychotherapists over several decades and throughout her life she continued to develop her ideas and methods.

Work
Gerda Boyesen developed, among other things, the theory that the dismantling of psychological stress is also connected with the digestive system. She came to the conclusion that certain massage techniques could bring to completion the expression of unwanted feelings, or "incomplete cycles," and this release of emotional charge would entail similar noises from the intestines as during digestion of food.<ref>Monika Schaible, Biodynamic massage as aody therapy, and as a tool in body therapy. In: Linda Hartley, Contemporary body psychotherapy: the Chiron approach, Routledge / Taylor & Francis, 2008, pages 31–45, page 34 ff.</ref> Boyesen called these noises psychoperistalsis. This process of "digesting" psychological problems is often accompanied by new insights. For this reason she was often called "the lady with the stethoscope" in body psychotherapeutic circles as she used the stethoscope to get a clearer impression of the bowel noises of her clients. She could allegedly differentiate a multiplicity of peristaltic noises, diagnostically arrange and make inferences on the subconscious processes of the clients. To Boyesen it was a good sign when the client's "psychoperistalsis" was in a particular way at the end of a session. That meant it was resolving somewhat and would be able to organize anew without the old restrictive pattern. Biodynamic massage is also practiced as a therapy separate to Biodynamic Psychotherapy.

Apart from the emphasis on gentle unloading through massage she also worked with Wilhelm Reich's vegetotherapy as well as the theories of Jung and Freud, and she continued to develop these into her own method. In this manner the client is to be encouraged to discover his or her own mental experience (introspective ability), to follow and to express his or her bodily-psychological impulses. Unconscious conflicts would in this way be brought to the surface and to conscious attention and could then be further processed with psychotherapy and finally resolved.

A further element is the Deep Draining, a special kind of massage aimed at affecting "deeper layers," which is supposed to contribute to attitude changes, physically as well as psychologically. Neurotic patterns would thus be traced, loosened and finally resolved.

With Alexander Lowen (Bioenergetics), Boyesen was one of the founders of modern body psychotherapy. Boyesen was an honorary member of the European Association for Body Psychotherapy EABP as well as honorary president of the German Gesellschaft für Biodynamische Psychologie (Society for Biodynamics psychology), the professional association for biodynamics therapists in Germany. Biodynamic Psychology is recognised as a method by the European Association for Psychotherapy EAP. The education of Biodynamics body psychotherapists through the European School for Biodynamics and Erogenetics in Lübeck and through the Ecole Biodynamique in France is recognized by the EABP as a psychotherapist education.

 Criticism 

Like most body psychotherapeutic schools, Biodynamics is not recognized by the health insurance companies in the United States as a scientifically based therapeutic intervention.
However, in Switzerland, Biodynamic Therapy is covered by health care insurance and accepted by the State Secretariat for Education, Research and Innovation. 

 Publications 
 Boyesen, Gerda; Boyesen, Mona Lisa, "Biodynamische Theorie und Praxis", in: Hilarion G. Petzold [Ed.], Die neuen Körpertherapien, 1st ed. Paderborn: Jungfermannsche Verlagsbuchhandlung, 1977, pp. 140-157
 Boyesen, Gerda; Boyesen, Mona Lisa, Biodynamik des Lebens: Die Gerda-Boyesen-Methode - Grundlage der biodynamischen Psychologie, Essen: Synthesis, 1987, 183 p.
 Boyesen, Gerda, Über den Körper die Seele heilen: Biodynamische Psychologie und Psychotherapie, Munich: Kösel, 1994 (7th ed.) 
 Boyesen, Gerda; Leudesdorff, Claudia; Santner, Christoph, Von der Lust am Heilen: Quintessenz meines Lebens, Munich: Kösel, 1995, 
 Boyesen, Gerda, Entre psyché et soma, Payot, 1996 
 Boyesen, Gerda; Bergholz, Peter, Dein Bauch ist klüger als du'', Hamburg, Miko-Edition, 2003 
 The ‘New’ Collected Papers of Biodynamic Psychology, Massage & Psychotherapy: 2022 A Collection of Articles gathered in Celebration of the 100th Anniversary of Gerda Boyesen’s birth Edited by COURTENAY YOUNG  (eBook)

References

External links 
 
 The Gerda Boyesen International Institute
 The London School of Biodynamic Psychotherapy (Gerda Boyesen Method) Ltd a non-profit Training School offering introductory workshops and UKCP recognised (United Kingdom Council for Psychotherapy) Diploma Course (4 yrs part-time) and Therapist referral in the UK (T/A Centre for Biodynamic Body Psychotherapy)
 Website for graduates of the Chiron Centre for Body Psychotherapy - London
 Association Professionnelle de Psychologie Biodynamique - France
 U.S. Association for Body Psychotherapy (USABP)
 European Association for Body Psychotherapy (EABP) 

Body psychotherapy
Psychotherapists
1922 births
2005 deaths
Norwegian psychologists
Norwegian women psychologists
People from Bergen in health professions
20th-century psychologists